Edgar Stakset (born 30 April 1937) is a Norwegian former footballer who played as a midfielder for Steinkjer FK. He made 26 appearances for the Norway national team from 1960 to 1967.

References

External links
 

1937 births
Living people
People from Steinkjer
Norwegian footballers
Association football midfielders
Norway international footballers
Norway youth international footballers
Norway under-21 international footballers
Steinkjer FK players
Sportspeople from Trøndelag